Dukes is a Metropolitan Borough of Sefton ward in the Southport Parliamentary constituency that covers the western part of the localities of Birkdale and Hillside in the town of Southport. The ward population taken at the 2011 census was 13,333.

Councillors
 indicates seat up for re-election.
 indicates by-election.

Election results

Elections of the 2020s

Elections of the 2010s

References

Wards of the Metropolitan Borough of Sefton
Southport